Alpenus maculosus is a species of moth of the  family Erebidae. It was described by Caspar Stoll in 1781. It is found along the Gold Coast and in Lagos, Sierra Leone, Guinea, Angola, Cameroon, Nigeria, the Republic of the Congo, Uganda, eastern Africa and Zimbabwe.

The larvae feed on Commelina, Aster, Bidens pilosa, Senecio abyssinicus, Ipomoea, Zea mays, Arachis hypogaea, Phaseolus, Pseudarthria, Voandzeia subterranea, Gossypium and Theobroma cacao.

References

Moths described in 1781
Spilosomina
Moths of Africa